Overland Bound is a 1929 American Western film directed by Leo D. Maloney and starring Maloney, Allene Ray, Jack Perrin and Lydia Knott. It is considered to be the first all-talking B Western to be made, following on from the success of the hit Fox Western In Old Arizona. Despite the drawback of the film's poor sound recording quality, it was successfully distributed. It was Maloney's final film as he died shortly after its release.

Synopsis
A man tries to trick a mother and her daughter into selling their ranch, a potentially lucrative property on the site of a future railroad. He hires a man to pose as the mother's long-lost son.

Cast
 Leo D. Maloney as Lucky Lorimer 
 Allene Ray as Mary Winters
 Jack Perrin as Larry Withers / Jimmy Winters
 Lydia Knott as Ma Winters
 Hal Taliaferro as Buck Hawkins
 Charles K. French as Underwood
 Albert J. Smith as Keno Creager
 William Dyer as Boss Wheeler 
 Starlight the Horse as Starlight
 Bullet the Dog as Bullet

References

Bibliography
 Tuska, Jon. The Vanishing Legion: A History of Mascot Pictures, 1927-1935. McFarland, 1999.

External links
 

1929 films
1929 Western (genre) films
1920s English-language films
American Western (genre) films
Films directed by Leo D. Maloney
Rayart Pictures films
Transitional sound Western (genre) films
1920s American films